The Central Intelligence Agency has been active in the Philippines almost since the agency's creation in the 1940s. The CIA's main headquarters for Southeast Asia is located in Manila, the capital of the Philippines. The CIA was founded in 1947 and first played a major role in the Philippines three years later. The presence of U.S. military bases in the Philippines, originally conceived through the 1947 Military Bases Agreement giving the United States authorization to utilize Clark Field and Subic Bay, made it highly accessible to the agency. During this time, the CIA ran many covert operations in the country and employed it as a base to launch actions against other countries. The agency had supply, training, and logistical centers on multiple Philippine islands. After their successful counterinsurgency against the Hukbalahap,  the CIA reused this model in both Vietnam and Latin America. The CIA deployed psychological warfare in the Philippines as well as force.

The Philippines, formally titled the Republic of the Philippines, is an archipelago nation in Southeast Asia between the Philippine Sea and the South China Sea to the east of Vietnam. It is the main "US imperial power [base] in Southeast Asia," according to Roland G. Simbulan of the University of the Philippines. Credible allegations exist revealing that the CIA has operated in support of the pro-American for big businesses such as Coca-Cola which is called Crony capitalism oligarchy in the Philippines, and uses its resources to advance the interests of American corporations such as Ford, Nike,  and Coca-Cola. The CIA and the United States have consistently played a role in political and economic life of the Philippines. The Filipino counterpart to the CIA is the National Intelligence Coordinating Agency (NICA), with which it cooperates.

Hukbalahap (Huk) Rebellion 

In 1898, the Philippines became a colony of the U.S. after the territory was relinquished by Spain following the American victory of the Spanish–American War lasting from April–August 1898. During World War II, the Imperial Japanese Army occupied the islands from 1942 to 1945 and where General MacArthur vowed to return to the island. The Hukbalahap (Huk) was formed in order to fend off the Japanese during their occupation. The Huk resistance created strongholds throughout Philippine villages using guerrilla warfare tactics. During this time, the movement was widespread and largely successful. After the Philippines were liberated by the Americans and Filipino Troops, the United States of America began to influence and control the Philippine government once again. The U.S. ordered the Philippine government to disarm and arrest the Huks, even as it permitted more right-wing militias to keep their weapons. These activities were overseen by the Counter-Intelligence Corps, a predecessor to the CIA. The Americans presumed the Huks advocated a communist ideology which would make them a threat in post World War II. With aid from the U.S., the Philippine military began to hunt down the Huks. The guerillas took refuge in the mountains and soon began to counter-attack the Philippine government.

As the amount of free trade between the U.S. and the Philippines increased, landowners began to favor the cultivation and exportation of cash crops to the USA such as tobacco and sugar cane over rice and cereals, which resulted in a reduced food supply for the peasants which would lead to other issues much later on relating to starvation. During this time, the farming industry in the Philippines underwent a major transformation. Farmers began to favor trade with the United States over that with the Filipino locals.   Traditional landowners hired tenants with legal contracts forming a rentier relationship as an effort to maximize their profits.  Tenants were responsible for all the hard labor on farms per their contractual agreements. The obligations of this newly formed relationship of landlord and tenants made it almost impossible for the peasants to survive.  Eventually, farmers sought new and innovated forms of cultivation to maximize profit.  Farmers found that by implementing farming machinery like that in the U.S., then they could maximize time and profits.  With the addition of machinery, farmers were rarely seen working on their own land. The new tenant farming arrangements were even more strenuous than traditional arrangements as the returns were 60/40 in favor of the landowner as opposed to the traditional 50/50 split. This seemed unsustainable to the Huks.  The in-sustainability was rooted in the new division between the elite and the poor. The peasants then came together to host riots and strikes against the elite in efforts to revert the Philippines back to the "old" tactics of farming.  Their efforts were futile as the elite received support from the United States.

Peasants decided to form their own social organizations as a way to voice concerns, demanding change and a reinforced protection of their rights. After numerous protests and strikes, the status quo between the peasants and the landowners remained. As a result, the peasants decided to join forces with the Huks to combat the economic injustices. The union of the peasants and the Huks intensified the "Huk-resistance" against the government of the Philippines. The Huks developed major influence in local politics with an image of "Robin Hood and taking from the rich and helping the poor". Huks were hunted continuously by the Philippine and U.S. governments. There is a dispute as to how ingrained a Marxist–Leninist communist ideology was within the organization, but they appeared to have some connections with subgroups of the Communist Party. The massacre of Huk squadron 77, that occurred in February 1945, consisted of 109 Huks who were shot and buried in a mass grave by Filipinos and U.S. soldiers.

On August 24, 1948, the CIA received a message from Filipino Secretary of Defense Ruperto Kangleon. This message detailed a peace offering from the Huks to the Filipino government. Their demands included an American expulsion, the cancellation of all base agreements with the United States, and the cancellation of the trade parity. Any cessation in hostility or truces that took place during that time period were only at the top level between government officials and peasant leaders. The fighting on the ground continued largely unabated. Kangleon saw these demands as detrimental to Filipino interests. Kangleon also informed the CIA that he had come into possession of recordings of high ranking Huks meeting with leading Communists. These recordings implicated President Elpidio Quirino's brother as being a Communist, causing upheaval for the government. Kangleon also claimed that the Huks were preparing to overthrow the Filipino government in the advent of war between the Soviet Union and the United States. It was even alleged that the Soviet Union was supplying the Huk rebellion with guns, ammunition and supplies via submarine shipments.

On September 15, 1951, the CIA released an assessment on the strength of the Huk. Based on the assessment, the Huk had reached the peak of strength in 1950. The danger of the Huks overthrowing the government had receded. Factors that contributed to the increase of strength included a lack of funds in the public treasury, low export prices, exposed scandals involving high Filipino government officials and the public concern of local government payments being balanced. The outcome of these negative factors enabled the Hukbalahap to gain a large amount of support from the peasants. The CIA would later form their own organizations or would manipulate their own organizations for their own interests.

On April 15, 1950, the CIA issued an information report regarding Huk arms from US surplus and the location of Huk leaders in Singapore. The report first noted that the Huks possessed approximately 100 bazookas from US surplus that they would use in their main offensive. The CIA also reached an assessment that Huk leaders Mariano Balgos and Guillermo Capadocia were not in Singapore. They based this evaluation on the improvement of Huk coordination and leadership, leading the CIA to believe that the leaders were taking part in the action on the battlefield.

1940s 

In late 1947, the CIA released a country report on the Philippines that assessed the political and economic conditions of the newly independent nation. It further attributed political stability to the pro-American, liberal democratic Roxas administration, which maintained a strong political position and had successfully deterred violent opposition from the Hukbalahap leftist organization. The report also concluded that, wartime damage aside, the country appeared to be financially stable. U.S. economic aid, provided in the form of both direct and indirect assistance, was based on prior commitments the United States had made to the Philippines. The U.S. government promised to “assist in making the Philippines...economically secure.” The total direct financial aid provided in 1947 and expected to be fully paid by 1950 exceeded $800 million and was filed under the Philippine Rehabilitation Act. Indirect aid came in the form of military and naval equipment, veterans’ benefits, and army and navy expenditures. The indirect aid was valued at $700 million in 1951.

The report emphasized the important political and economic impacts that U.S. assistance had on Filipino government. The improvement of infrastructure, industry, and agriculture helped lift the Philippines out of financial disorganization and possible political instability. The aid also increased popular support for the pro-American Roxas regime. However, while U.S. assistance aimed to build up the nation, it did not come without political objectives. The report described the aims of the U.S. government in providing the aid which included the solidification of a “strong independent, democratic, and friendly Republic.” The report expressed optimistic beliefs that the Roxas regime would implement fiscal reforms that would further consolidate political stability.  The report suggests that financial assistance should be a last resort and if the appropriate measures are taken, the Philippines will not be able to obtain financial aid from the US. It also suggests that any support or assistance should be technical and administrative. The report concluded that policy objectives from both the CIA and the State Department should encourage the Philippines to participate with the United Nations and its specialized agencies.

1950s 
In 1950, the CIA studied conditions that were causing unrest. A partially declassified intelligence memorandum titled “The Situation in the Philippines” from June 1950 highlighted how the CIA viewed the political situation in the Philippines. While the agency believed that after President Quirino fell, a US-allied government would follow, it stressed that the Philippines could become a communist country should conditions continue to deteriorate. It found that Filipino trust in their president was steadily decreasing due to his administration's lack of power. They determined the ineptitude of then-President Quirino would lead to political upheaval rendering the Philippine police and military incapable at maintaining law and order in the country or stopping Hukbalahap raids in Luzon. It was initially believed that the political instability in the Philippines would drive President Quirino out of office and possibly be succeeded by a pro-US replacement. However, if the instability were to continue to worsen for another decade or so after that, the likelihood of a communist takeover would greatly increase.

A declassified report from the CIA mentions that “in early 1950 the Huks numbered some 20,000 and were gaining support as a result of popular disillusion with the government and ill-disciplined armed forces”. The Huks had been able to perform successful raids against President Quirino. The success of the Huk raids relied “on mass support, without which they [could not] win or even exist". By the end of 1951, the Huks lost a large portion of their fighting forces due to Magsaysay bringing order back to the Filipino military.

The election of 1951 was not rigged, producing a big effect on the population of the Philippines. The Huks had tried to stop the voter participation with slogans including "Boycott the Election."  However, many of the Huks ranks soon scattered and turned themselves in to authorities. Groups of Huks began to come into army camps, voluntarily surrendering and commenting bitterly that they had been misled by their leaders. In 1952, support for the Huks was close to non-existent. The Huks withdrew most forces from their old heartland in the Northern Manila province. The main Huk forces retreated south into the jungles where they set up new camps and new headquarters. The Huks believed they were safe from the Philippine forces and would have time to rebuild. The Philippine army and the U.S. Battalion Combat Team (BCT) hunted the Huks into the jungles, once again forcing the rebels to relocate.

Shortly after becoming Defense Minister in 1950, future Philippines president Ramon Magsaysay began a series of programs to undermine the popularity of the Huks nationally. The first program organized a Defense Corps, starting from 1950 and ending in 1955, to resettle Huks and their families. In 1954, in order to win more favor from the general populace, Magsaysay created the National Resettlement and Rehabilitation agency, which redistributed land to the peasants of the Philippines, as well as encouraging migration to the more rural areas of the country. By the time Magsaysay died in 1957, he had completely undermined the Huk movement, changing it from a strong movement with thousands of armed insurgents to a few hundred with little public support.

On September 6, 1955, the United States and the Philippines signed the Laurel-Langley Agreement, which amended the Bell Trade Act. The Laurel-Langley Agreement reduced the dependency of the Filipino economy on the US economy and brought down tariffs. The United States could no longer control the ratio of the US money to Filipino money.

As stated in a lecture at the University of the Philippines-Manila, Professor Roland G. Simbulan demonstrated that at this time the CIA was covertly sponsoring the Security Training Center on the outskirts of Manila as a, "countersubversion, counterguerilla and psychological warfare school." The CIA was worried that they and the Philippine government were losing control of the rural areas of the Philippines to the Huks and their perceived Communist ideology. Through this organization, CIA funds were funneled into the National Citizens' Movement for Free Elections (NAMFREL) community centers, the Philippine Action in Development, and through the Asia Foundation. Public service ads were made and broadcast during the height of global Soviet aggression and the country initiated a large scale anti-Communist campaign. Propaganda was produced depicting the hard and terrible life one would live under communist rule and how one would lose their autonomy as well as their religion and families. The US reinforced its interests by backing American businesses and American-funded organizations. The American government did this by funneling grant money via USAID, National Endowment for Democracy (NED), and the Ford Foundation. The constant stream of financial backing rewarded the Filipino elite for promoting American interests. Community Planning Development Center requests for millions of dollars could generate possibilities for "projects such as feeder roads, pure water, irrigation, additional cooperatives, and warehousing facilities." By creating better standards of living for the poor, Magsaysay could combat communism by undercutting the need for it. Therefore, Magsaysay focused on "rural rehabilitation" to help the lowest income bracket. Magsaysay wanted to develop a program to eliminate the poverty and enrich the rural, lower class. However, this fostered an economic dependence on American funds—a double-edged sword for the Philippines. All of these efforts were in order to influence the rural Filipino people to support the American-backed government. Thus the Philippines were one of the first locations in which the CIA attempted psychological operations  alongside force to influence its desired outcomes.

Philippine president Ramon Magsaysay entrusted Colonel Edward Lansdale as his military adviser and also as his speechwriter. Secretly Lansdale was working for the CIA and funneled $1 million of agency money to Magsaysay, along with additional funds from the Coca Cola Company. Through Lansdale's influence on Magsaysay, the U.S. was able to spread American policy into Southeast Asia. Many programs were launched by the United States such as: Freedom Company of the Philippines, Eastern Construction Company, and "Operation Brotherhood" which allowed Filipino personnel to deploy in other Asian countries for covert Filipino operations. Actively using the Philippines territories, the CIA was able to established supply as well as training and logistics bases on several Philippines islands. This included the Tawi-Tawi Island of Sanga-Sanga, which was a base for an airstrip. These were employed for the mission to overthrow the Indonesian President Sukarno and destroy the Indonesian left-wing. The CIA specifically supported Indonesian colonels who disapproved of Sukarno and trained them and other subversives at the above-mentioned bases. In this way, the CIA provided aid, advice, and instructions directly to military rebel groups.

In the summer of 1952, Philippine president Ramon Magsaysay offered the Huks a choice of either all-out friendship or all-out force. Magsaysay's presidential term was set to end in December 1957, however, before he could leave office, he died in a plane crash in March 1957. According to a Memo intended for the Director of Central Intelligence, the death of Magsaysay caused the political polarization of the Philippines to intensify. The CIA believed that Magsaysay's death would initiate an upheaval, causing different political groups to compete for power. They also believed that US-Philippine relations would decline because there was no acceptable replacement that would have the same connections to the US. It also addressed the possibility that along with the death of Magsaysay, pro-American sentiment may decrease. More specifically, it warned against the possible rise of nationalism and communism as forces that could begin to influence policy in the Philippines, namely policies that were not in the best interest of the United States. This would begin to shape future US policy with the Philippines, as the fear of communism began to rise. However, there were hopes of the Liberal Party taking over the political spectrum with their possible candidate Jose Yulo. Yulo is held in high regard to his integrity and ability to lead and he also is pro-American. Carlos Garcia, being the incumbent, had a great advantage, but was facing a strong opposition with the little time he had to exploit his position.

Manila 
Regarded as a "stronghold of US imperial power in Asia," the Philippines capital, Manila, has been the main station or regional headquarters for the United States CIA since the late-1940s. Due to American Filipinos heavily influenced by American culture, the CIA was able to recruit people willing to provide critical intelligence and engage in treason within the agency. Intelligence collection in Manila is also a part of a covert and offensive operation where people, ideas, or places that deemed to be threats to the U.S. were attacked and neutralized. In the early 1950s, the CIA established the Trans-Asiatic Airlines Inc. as a front to recruit veteran Filipino war pilots and veterans from the Armed Forces of the Philippines’ Military Intelligence Services (MIS) who were active in their service still.

Through Manila, the CIA and the Joint U.S. Military Advisory Group (JUSMAG) engineered the bloody suppression of the nationalist Hukbong Mapagpalayang Bayans (HMB). Success from this CIA suppression was made into a model for future counterinsurgency operations including the Phoenix Program in Vietnam and a multitude of missions in Latin America including the overthrow of Chilean President Salvadore Allende in 1973. CIA agents Lansdale and Valeriano used their counter-guerrilla experiences in the Philippines to train covert operatives for Vietnam and guerrilla assassins for Latin America. The Philippines became the CIA's prototype in successful covert operations and psychological warfare.

Also, in Manila, the CIA was able to possess and control the “Regional Service Center” (RSC). The RSC is a CIA front for the United States Information Service. This state-of-the-art printing facility covertly serves as a propaganda plant, and it has the capabilities to manufacture large amounts of first-rate color magazines, posters, and pamphlets in at least 14 different Asian Languages. During the Vietnam War, the RSC was involved in the CIA attempts to sabotage North Vietnam economy. The RSC counterfeit North Vietnam currency and airdropped through the North Vietnam territory in order to paralyze the resistance.

In a lecture given at the University of the Philippines Manila on August 18, 2000, Roland B. Simbulan, Coordinator of the Manila Studies Program, said of the CIA's presence in the Philippines: "The CIA in the Philippines has engaged in countless covert operations for intervention and dirty tricks particularly in Philippine domestic policies. On top of all this is the U.S. diplomatic mission, especially the political section that is a favorite cover for CIA operatives. CIA front companies also provide an additional but convenient layer for operatives assigned overseas. "In general, wherever you find U.S. big business interests...you also find a very active CIA." These business interests include big corporations such as Nike, United Fruits, Coca~Cola, Ford, and Citicorp. Relatedly, CIA operative David Sternberg fronted as a foreign correspondent for an American newspaper based in Boston, The Christian Science Monitor, when he assisted Gabriel Kaplan in managing the presidential campaign of Ramon Magsaysay."

On April 18, 1973, National Security Advisor Henry Kissinger discussed the possibility of the United States State Department to consider providing assistance in improving the Manila police administration in the form of equipment and expert advice. The discussion of merging the 17 separate departments into one was highlighted in this letter.

1960s 
In 1957, the CIA expressed concern over a potential political uprising in the region, and particularly of a communist Huk resurgence. According to an official CIA report from April 18, 1967, the group had gained considerable influence over the past 20 months. The report states, "The number of armed cadre has grown from an estimated 37 to 300-400, and the US embassy in Manila estimates that mass base support has increased by five to eight percent.". The presidential elections that were occurring that year were sent into disarray after President Ramon Magsaysay died in an aircraft accident, leading to political disarray throughout the country and a slight decay of US-Philippines relations. In 1960, the CIA recognized Philippine concern over a Huk resurgence in the region after killings on the island of Luzon, where Manila is located. The armed forces were called in fear of a communist uprising, but most of the fears went unwarranted at the time. While the Huk resurged in the 1960s, they were not able to cause an insurrection like that of their earlier attempt again.

While they did not believe they posed too large of a threat, there was concern that "any failure by Marcos to reduce Huk influence could" cost him the election. In 1966, the CIA was concerned if there were nuclear weapons stored in the Philippine due to the reports given by Robert McClintock. President Marcos did know of the Nuclear weapons. It was crucial for the Philippine government to be unaware of this as it might threaten the US-Philippine relations and affect the elections.

From 1965 to 1967, the Huk began to show an increase in presence again with new activity in the region and a growth in strength. There were 17 assassinations and killings in 1965, and the number spiked to 71 in 1967. Although most of these assassinations and killings were of smaller figures, the greatest act of terror carried out in this period was the assassination of Mayor Anastasio Gallardo of Candaba who was the chairman of the anti-HUK mayors league. The assassination occurred while he was on his way to meet with President Marcos. This event froze the League of anti-HUK mayors out of fear the same would happen to them.

In 1965, President Ferdinand E. Marcos took office commencing a 20-year presidency.

In 1967, President Marcos began to make attempts to slow growth of the Huks by promoting developmental efforts in the Central Luzon region. The CIA intelligence, however, reported that the programs were having minimal impact on the region or the Huks influence. The Huks were still able to maintain some power through voter intimidation and helping impoverished peasants. The Huks successfully entered politics in 1967 with a slate 23 affiliates who successfully gained office. The CIA estimated that there were still around 140 armed rebels and that sympathizers numbered around 30,000. Their activity had also increased, the assassinations had increased to around 70 people, originally starting at around only 17. At the same time, President Marcos began to increase efforts fighting the remaining Huks, but with their recent election success, the CIA deemed his efforts inconsistent. Early in 1967, suspecting the growth in Huk activity signified an increase of their power, the CIA concluded that same year that the Huks possessed little communist influence left in their overall ideology and proved little to no further threat to the government of the Philippines.

In 1969, a memorandum concerning U.S. commitments abroad circulated among U.S. officials. The memo indicated that there could be a disastrous fallout between the US and Philippines should word spread that U.S. had been storing nuclear weapons in the Philippines without the prior consent of the Filipino government. A subsequent memo disclosed that, although the Filipino public and government was unaware of the stored weapons, Marcos had secretly known about them, yet did not reveal their existence as it would have been disadvantageous in the upcoming elections.

1970s
On March 15, 1973, a memorandum discussed the department of defense and the state having provided assistance that which included equipment. The number of active Muslim insurgents were thought to be about 17,000 dispersed throughout various areas including Cotabato and Sulu. The rebels were said to be armed with machine guns and rockets. The Muslim threat was not considered an immediate threat to U.S. security in the country. The U.S. was concerned if their provided assistance would hurt their relations with Malaysia and Indonesia. The U.S. also feared if the Muslim insurrection was able to gain traction, this would also negatively impact the U.S. involvement in the Philippines. Despite these fears, Kissinger explained why the US should keep its position towards Marcos. In a memorandum dated March 16, 1973, Kissinger stated there was no alternative to Marcos. Moreover, he stated Marcos had shown he was willing to cooperate with the United States. An NSSM was issued on March 21 for the Muslim uprising. This was decided by Kissinger and Holdridge.

In July 1974, the Laurel-Langley Agreement expired, which left the United States nervous about future trade with the Philippines. Before the agreement expired, the United States had exemptions to the Philippine Constitution, which gave them more freedom in trade. The United States quickly began to negotiate a new trade agreement in Manila, named the Treaty of Economic Cooperation and Development. However, President Marcos made the creation of a new trade agreement difficult, which led to many roadblocks in establishing a new agreement.

In 1977, public warnings circulated that President Marcos might dissolve the arrangement with U.S. military bases. Marcos being influenced by his staff to protect their strategic interest and force the U.S. to agree to his terms.

Martial Law in the Philippines 
On September 22, 1972, President Marcos declared martial law in the country under the pretext of protecting it from Communist threats. The CIA had known about this declaration and reported it back to the US government. Marcos had been debating several options to stay in power, such as delaying the elections or running a surrogate candidate, but he found imposing martial law to be the easiest path. Marcos quickly jailed his political rivals and seized his goal of rewriting the constitution to remain in power for the foreseeable future. Marcos justified his use of martial law in an attempt to “restructure” the Philippine society. He asserted that all his decrees were well within legal constraints.

Marcos claimed that martial law was a necessary response to terrorism, particularly a series of deadly bombings from 1971, including one that killed nine people at Plaza Miranda. The CIA was aware that Marcos stood responsible for at least one of these attacks and were almost certain that they were not perpetrated by Communists. The agency did not share this information with the opposition. The CIA did, however, bribe opposition politicians not to challenge the presence of US military bases or dominance of American corporations at the constitutional convention of 1971. President Nixon approved Marcos' martial law initiative because he accepted the Filipino leader's claim that the country was being terrorized by Communists.

Marcos insisted he was going to eradicate corruption through the imposition of martial law. Many people questioned the reason behind Marcos declaring martial law. In this decree, the entire country of the Philippines was considered a land reform area. Peasants were supposed to be given land as a part of this agreement but when the martial rule ended, less than four percent of peasants owned their land. Only the enemies of Marcos lost their land in the martial law. These enemies of Marcos saw their land and businesses taken from them and given to friends and associates of Marcos. The Lopez Clan perhaps suffered the most as Marcos seized all of their profitable businesses. Matters had deteriorated so significantly that the nephew of the former vice president, Geny Lopez, was thrown in jail for being involved in a plot to assassinate the President. With hopes of securing the release of Geny, the Lopez family was forced to give up more of their businesses to Marcos. He inherited the electric company and TV network but did not keep his end of the deal and Geny remained in jail. These events continued the trend of Marcos and those close to him receiving benefits that had been taken from others. This became known as "crony capitalism." The idea of crony capitalism centered around the fact that all major corporations and business interests in the Philippines were controlled by the Marcos family or his close friends and allies. In all, the Marcos family controlled eighteen companies, and the Marcos administration issued formal decrees specifically designed to hurt competition (thus helping themselves) and to "pamper" his cronies.

U.S. – Philippine relations were strained due to the U.S. military bases agreements. On December 11, 1976, President Marcos stated in a public foreign policy address that all U.S. bases must pay rent to the Philippine government. Secretary of Defense Donald Rumsfeld wrote to Secretary of State Henry Kissinger on December 29, 1976, regarding the request. Secretary Rumsfeld stated that this was against US policy and that it was incumbent upon Secretary Kissinger to tell Marcos that the US would not pay rent. Rumsfeld would state that there were profound implications for military arrangements across the globe. He stated further that it was critical to US-Philippine relations to resolve the matter. Secretary Kissinger and Foreign Secretary Romulo talked negotiation agreements but could not come to conclusions, concluding that multiple issues still needed a resolution. The US attempted to show they were being flexible through useless concessions. They believed this would get the Filipinos to acquiesce to items the US desired in the agreement. Marcos wanted to delicately address the negotiation issues due to the Philippines violations of human rights which weakened their image to the U.S. President Marcos had been concerned with the importance of human rights to the U.S. government. This was a major reason for Marcos wanting the U.S. to pay rent for their military bases instead of U.S. military support. It gave an outlet for the Philippine government to avoid congressional questioning.

In August 1977, Marcos relaxed his martial law decrees in an attempt to improve his human rights perception in the U.S. He believed that this new image would assist in the resumed negotiations with the U.S. on the military bases agreement. Marcos’ new stance granted amnesty to certain low-level detainees who agreed to act within the law “voluntarily”. Intelligence suggested that there were almost 4,000 detainees, including political detainees. However, amnesty would not be offered to these political prisoners who had been imprisoned since 1972 when martial law was established. Marcos also promised to rid the country of the nationwide curfew with exception to areas the military had previously declared critical.

President Jimmy Carter began to prop up the opposition to Marcos in 1978, and, during this time, the highly popular Ninoy Aquino began to campaign from his prison cell, as he, like all Filipino political dissenters, was incarcerated. Pope John Paul II and President Reagan attempted to force Marcos to loosen his grip on the Filipino people, and martial law was lifted, however Marcos held on to almost all of the same powers he had under martial law. Fearing that he would be blamed if Ninoy died in the hospital, Marcos allowed Ninoy to be transported to the United States for open heart surgery, where he stayed for three years before returning to the Philippines.

1980
In 1979, the United States amended their Military Base Agreement (MBA) with the Philippines in order to quell any public concerns regarding sovereignty of US military bases in the Philippines. Additionally President Ferdinand Marcos wanted to determine how strong the relationship was between the two countries. The main goal was to reaffirm that the US was not looking to expand control or attain more rights in the Philippines, but that they were operating their facilities as normal, keeping the status quo. The amendment addressed flights and transit as it pertained to Middle East oil security, aid package negotiations, and Philippine authority over customs, immigration, and quarantines. Finalized in 1982, the amendment did not negatively effect the use of military bases in the Philippines.

The CIA also considered becoming more involved in the region again in the 1980s, particularly in 1985 before President Ferdinand Marcos left the presidency. The United States needed the Philippines to be a stable democratic ally to prevent the spread of communism in Southeast Asia as well as to keep critical strategic military bases active. An Airgram in 1983 to the State Department from the Manila embassy states that there is corruption and 'crony capitalism' under Marcos' presidency. A correspondence between Carl W. Ford, Jr., the officer in charge of intelligence in East Asia, and the director of central intelligence, William J. Casey, indicated that the CIA considered attempting to influence the Philippine government: "at our last meeting you asked that I give more thought to the crucial issue of the Marcos Era drawing to a close, specifically, how the US might go about influencing Marcos to lay down the ground work for a smooth succession." Even then, the document also expresses a fear by the CIA that there would be more communist activity in the region, and that combined with economic issues caused extreme concern.

In the document, Ford Jr. outlined the CIA's distrust of Marcos’ government, and the real possibility that his administration did not have a future. He insisted that Marcos’ days were limited, and asserted that whether Marcos was removed by “death, retirement, or forcible removal,” the CIA would need to be prepared to replace him. He also described six “hypothetical” possibilities associated with the regime change. Three of the options involved Marcos being involved in the transition, while the other three saw Marcos as a problematic figure who would not be part of the new government. In any case, Ford Jr. repeatedly stated his opinion that the US needed to choose and influence Marcos’ possible running mate and successor. The troubling nature of this document is revealed by the admittance that the six plans discussed “are not based on any preconceived notion or analysis of root causes of problems today confronting the Philippines. After the assassination of Philippines senator Benigno Aquino Jr, the CIA began discretely manipulating Filipino leaders to promote US positive reformations, as well as offering $45 million a year for development assistance.

Following the fall of the Marcos' government, the CIA began closely monitoring and assessing the health of the new government, which the CIA's World Factbook refers to as a "people power" movement, under President Corazon Aquino. This was a pivotal period for the CIA in the Philippines. At this time, the CIA was struggling to gain control over the political landscape of the post-Marcos Philippines. The CIA felt threatened by the anti-imperialist groups that emerged in the Philippines after Marcos left power and began advocating for funding various Filipino organizations in attempts to combat these progressive forces. Shortly thereafter, the United States Agency for International Development (USAID) began financially supporting the Trade Union Congress of the Philippines (TUCP) in order to develop an agricultural reform program that would complement other existing programs and mitigate campesino uprising. In addition, the National Endowment for Democracy (NED) gave about $9 million in monetary donations to various Filipino organizations such as TUCP, the Women's Movement for the Nurturing of Democracy (KABATID), Namfrel, and the Philippine Chamber of Commerce and Industry (PCCI) between the mid to late 1980s. The agenda behind all these donations was to popularize the idea of democracy in the region. Towards the end of the 1980s the CIA unleashed an increasingly large amount of covert operations against leftist organizations in the Philippines. $10 million was given to the Armed Forced of the Philippines (AFP) for improved intelligence operations. The CIA increased the size of its personnel and sent more diplomats to the embassy in Manila.

The various coup attempts to oust the new president had the CIA worried about the survival of democracy in the Philippines as well as the effect this would have on U.S. interests in the country. In 1986, the CIA's Directorate of Intelligence office produced a report--"The Philippines' Corazon Aquino: Problems and Perspectives of a New Leader"—which characterized her as "maturing", but inexperienced and "lack[ing] political instincts...to color her perceptions of the problems facing her government and the best way to deal with them." The document goes on to describe her leadership style as populist, because of her emphasis on dialogue with her constituents, and because of her encouraging citizens at every level to become involved in the political process. Instead of acknowledging her attempt to promote a form of democracy in the post-Marcos Philippines, however, the document characterizes her as being overly concerned with her image, relying on personal politics, and as insecure ("not comfortable with her considerable authority"). The document goes on to lament that Aquinos has not publicly stated "what world leaders she respects and would like to emulate", disregarding the leader she had mentioned ("the only prominent figure whom she has said she admires is Mother Theresa of Calcutta"), and then suggests that Ramon Magsaysay would be a good role model, based on the fact that he, too, has "pride in being Filipino." Magsaysay was a former president of the Philippines, accused by his opponents as being an American puppet. In a 1987 memorandum from Carl W. Ford, Jr. to the Senior Review Panel he writes, "Recent events in the Philippines--particularly the coup attempt of August 28, and its aftermath--have raised serious questions about the survival of the Aquino government and the prospects for democracy. Should the Aquino government fail, the consequences for the United States will be severe". The document warns against alternative governments taking power because the CIA believed the Aquino government was, "...the best chance over the long term of establishing stability and democracy in the Philippines...". Ford feared that more turmoil in the country would provide a fertile ground for the Communist party to spread malcontent among the people and attempt to expand its influence. The CIA began to investigate the prospects for the short term survival of the Aquino government, its ability to create stability, and what the U.S. could do to shore up and support the new government.

The CIA's misgivings concerning the success of Aquino's presidency did not end with her lack of vocalized admiration for Magsaysay. One 66-page document given to the director of the CIA and prepared for the Philippine Task Force and the Office of East Asian Analysis in April 1986 highlights the CIA's worries over the economic state of the Philippines, citing the post-WWII population boom and Aquino's "massive foreign debt" as an indicator of future financial crisis. The document goes on to predict that the impending financial crisis, compounded with a decrease in the standard of living over the previous five years, agricultural difficulties, and unequal distribution of wealth, will lead to political instability, possibly affecting the CIA's interests in the region. The report details the effects of the population boom and projected population growth, reporting high unemployment rates, inflation, and poverty-related crime rates in the previous ten years, as well as reiterates the amount of foreign debt owed by the country, warning that "how Aquino deals with the debt issue" will have a significant impact on the financial well-being of the country. Although the uncensored parts of this document do not recommend any CIA action pertaining to the financial state of the Philippines, it does reflect the degree to which the CIA kept watch on the economies of its allies.

References

Philippines
Philippines
Philippines–United States relations